KYFR (920 AM) is a non-commercial radio station broadcasting a religious radio format. Located near Shenandoah, Iowa, United States, the station serves the Omaha area as well as portions of Iowa, Missouri, and Kansas. The station is owned by Family Radio and airs several Christian ministry broadcasts from noted teachers such as RC Sproul, Alistair Begg, Ken Ham, John F. MacArthur, Adriel Sanchez, Dennis Rainey, John Piper, & others as well as traditional and modern hymns & songs by Keith & Kristyn Getty, The Master's Chorale, Fernando Ortega, Chris Rice, Shane & Shane, Sovereign Grace Music, Sara Groves, & multiple other Christian and Gospel music artists.

History
The station began in 1925, when Henry Field of Henry Field Seed and Nursery Co. founded radio station KFNF. Rival station KMA began the same year, founded by Earl May, owner of another seed company. Both KFNF and KMA featured farm news and country music.

Antenna System 
The antenna array is located 3 miles north of the Iowa and Missouri border, near the town of Coin, Iowa. The system uses four  towers arranged in a directional array. During daytime hours, three of the towers are used with the transmitter operating at 5,000 watts.  At nighttime, all four towers are used when the transmitter power is reduced to 2,500 watts. The array provides two main lobes generally oriented northwest and southwest, ensuring coverage of the Omaha-Council Bluffs area both day and night.  The array also minimizes nighttime interference to co-channel stations WGNU (Granite City, Illinois), KDHL (Faribault, Minnesota), and WOKY (Milwaukee, Wisconsin) among others.

References

External links

YFR
Family Radio stations